The Women's 1500 metres competition at the 2021 World Single Distances Speed Skating Championships was held on 14 February 2021.

Results
The race was started at 12:35.

References

Women's 1500 metres
2021 in women's speed skating